Flop Goes the Weasel is a 1943 Warner Bros. Merrie Melodies cartoon directed by Chuck Jones. The short was released on March 20, 1943.

Plot
A mother hen is off trying to catch a worm for her soon to be baby. While out, a weasel steals the egg, wanting it for breakfast. Unfortunately the egg hatches and it mistakes that the weasel as its mother. The weasel wants to eat the chick, but it outsmarted him every time. For the last 3 minutes of the film, the weasel is constantly sneezing because the chick put pepper in his nose. He goes back to his biological mother, who found out that he had beaten up the weasel.

Reception
On July 30, 1949, Boxoffice reviewed the short: "Very Good. The so-called Wiley Weasel is flabbergasted when an egg he has stolen from a barnyard hen for his meal, hatches out a small chick. The chick mistakes the weasel for its mother and the rodent is forced to play the game. He tries, without success, to lure the chick into the roasting pan."

References

External links

1943 films
1943 animated films
1943 short films
Short films directed by Chuck Jones
Merrie Melodies short films
Warner Bros. Cartoons animated short films
Films scored by Carl Stalling
Films produced by Leon Schlesinger
1940s Warner Bros. animated short films
Films about weasels